FoodWorks is an Australian supermarket chain run by independent retail group  Australian United Retailers Limited (AURL). The AURL was created in November 2004 from the merger of the FoodWorks Supermarket Group Ltd (FSG) and Australian United Retailers (AUR). It is Australia's second largest leading independent supermarket retailing group, supporting in excess of A$1.35 billion in annual sales at the retail level. Its main competitors are Woolworths, Coles, IGA and Aldi.

Retail groups that were part of the merger included AUR, Foodstore, FoodWorks, Buy Rite, Cut Price, 727, Rite-Way, Banana Joe's, Food-Rite, Tuckerbag and Food-Way.

The AURL currently has over 600 supermarkets, grocery stores and convenience stores. The stores span seven states and territories with over 400 of them operating under the FoodWorks brand.

FoodWorks has some similarities to IGA, the brand's closest competitor. They have similar ancestry, both being created from independent retail stores merging to create supermarket groups. Also, both comprise multiple individual retailers originally trading under some of the same independent chains.

In addition, IGA's main home brand is Black and Gold, a generic food brand which also sells in FoodWorks stores across the country. FoodWorks have a number of their own generic brands.

Farmer Jacks FoodWorks 
Farmer Jacks FoodWorks operates FoodWorks stores in Western Australia. Farmer Jacks FoodWorks uses four trading names: "Farmer Jacks", "FoodWorks", "Farmer Jacks FoodWorks", Claremont store trades as "Jack's Wholefoods and Groceries" whilst in Kalgoorlie, Western Australia, the trading name is Hannan's Marketplace by FoodWorks. In Bridgetown the store trades as "Blackwood River Fresh FoodWorks".

See also

List of supermarket chains in Oceania

References

External links

Supermarkets of Australia
Australian companies established in 2004
Retail companies established in 2004
Companies based in Melbourne